The Andorran Chess Championship was first held in 1965. It is organized by FEVA, the chess federation of Andorra, which was founded in 1967.

Winners since 2000

{| class="sortable wikitable"
! Year !! Champion
|-
| 2000 || 
|-
| 2001 ||
|-
| 2002 || 
|-
| 2003 || 
|-
| 2004 ||Josep Oms i Pallisé
|-
| 2005 ||Josep Oms i Pallisé
|-
| 2006 ||Josep Oms i Pallisé
|-
| 2007 ||Òscar de la Riva
|-
| 2008 || 
|-
| 2009 ||Raül Garcia
|-
| 2010 ||Daniel José Queraltó
|-
| 2011 ||Raül Garcia
|-
| 2012 ||Òscar de la Riva
|-
| 2013 ||Raül Garcia
|-
| 2014 ||Òscar de la Riva
|-
| 2015 ||, 
|- 
| 2016 ||Robert Alomà
|-
| 2017 ||, Robert Alomà
|-
| 2018 || 
|-
|2019
|Robert Alomà
|}

References

Chess in Andorra
Chess national championships
1965 in chess
Recurring sporting events established in 1965
Sports competitions in Andorra
1965 establishments in Andorra
Chess